WXTB (97.9 FM) is a commercial active rock radio station owned by iHeartMedia and licensed to Clearwater, Florida, serving the Tampa Bay Area.  The WXTB studios are located in South Tampa, while the station transmitter resides in Holiday.  In addition to a standard analog transmission, WXTB broadcasts over two HD Radio channels, and is available online via iHeartRadio.

In addition to covering the Tampa Bay market as a whole, the station also covers areas of Levy County and Marion County, which are part of the Gainesville-Ocala radio market.

History
The station signed on the air in December 1967 as WQXM with a beautiful music format with owners John T. Rutledge and Joseph S. Field, with Jerry Reeves as music director and station manager until the sale of the station to Plough Broadcasting in 1975, switching to an AOR format under the name 98 Rock, Your Album Station in 1977. In 1983, the station changed their call letters to WZNE and rebranded as Z98, Tampa Bay's Hottest Hits. The station aired a hybrid AOR/Top 40 format until January 6, 1986, when it flipped to classic rock format as Classic Rock 97.9 WKRL.

WKRL lasted until December 30, 1989, when the signal went silent briefly, and then Led Zeppelin's "Stairway to Heaven" began playing in constant rotation, eventually lasting for 24 hours, as an early form of stunting. Finally, the repetition gave way to the announcement on December 31, 1989, that WKRL, now controlled by Great American Broadcasting, would be the first all-Led Zeppelin format station in the country, playing the band's entire catalog in its entirety as well as solo efforts by the bandmates and their other music-related projects. WKRL received national coverage from MTV to CBS and many other outlets, and was the first station to get worldwide coverage for a true "artist flip", where a broadcaster based its entire business on one group or solo artist.

Two weeks unfolded with conjecture from various news outlets as to how long this format could last, given that all studio Zeppelin recordings available at the time added up to less than 10 hours of continuous play. The station responded over the following week by adding a few classic acts such as Pink Floyd, ZZ Top, the Rolling Stones and Van Halen. With the bells of AC/DC's "Hells Bells" playing in the background, a major announcement came at noon on January 18, 1990, that the station would be changing its call letters to WXTB, and the station would be relaunched as The New 98 Rocks The Bay! or simply just known as The New 98 Rock.

New program director Gregory Mull, brought in from 96 K-Rock in Fort Myers to replace the outgoing Beau Raines, immediately reorganized the on-air personality list. Brian Smith and Bruce Barber, morning DJs who trailed in the ratings, both were released and replaced by morning newcomer Tommy "Seabass" Sebastian, who stunted his first few weeks as "Buck Maui" and is also the voice of the popular character "The Big Chief Meteorologist". Teddy "Ted Kamikaze" Cannarozzi was assigned to do the 10 a.m. to 2 p.m. slot. Scott "The Ledge" Ledger and Austin Keyes kept their afternoon and evening spots, respectively. Marla "Stone" Stonecipher, Kelli "K.C." Casey, Ronnie "Big Rig" Michaels, Heather McCoy, and Peter McLaren rounded out the schedule, and to complete the station Gregory hired Joe Kelly to become the official voice of WXTB.

In late 1990, 98 Rock launched what would turn into a 15-year tradition-the "Livestock" annual rock festival. A fusion of "Live Aid" and "Woodstock", Livestock was the brainchild of Mull and Sebastian. Each weekend-long Livestock event brought well-known national acts such as Soundgarden and Tesla together with lesser-known bands hoping for a chance at success. In keeping with the charitable spirit of Live Aid and other rock benefits, bands donated their performance time and a portion of the gate proceeds were donated to charities such as Greenpeace.

As the station rose in the ratings books, WXTB took over local promotional opportunities at The Rock-It Club and Killian's Rock Cafe in Ybor City. Meanwhile, WXTB gained a huge piece of the morning show market with the Seabass and Marla morning show. The new 98 Rock became a ratings success.

In 2000, the station moved its studios from Feather Sound Corporate Center to new owner iHeartMedia (then known as Clear Channel Communications)'s broadcast complex in southwest Tampa in an attempt to consolidate overall operations of Clear Channel stations in the area.

On January 18, 2010, at noon, WXTB replayed its format launch from 20 years earlier, including the final countdown in which soundbites from phone calls, many of which trashed then-rival WYNF, were played. The first four songs played after the launch ("Hells Bells" by AC/DC, "Kickstart My Heart" by Mötley Crüe, "Paradise City" by Guns N' Roses, and "Hot for Teacher" by Van Halen) were played again in tribute to the current format's 20th anniversary, along with original bumpers.

In April 2017, WXTB was named the new flagship station of the Tampa Bay Buccaneers Radio Network, taking over for sister station WFUS. For the first time in Buccaneers history, game days featured seven-and-a-half-hours of team programming completely on the FM dial, including pre- and post-game shows bookending the action on the field.

Starting with the 2022-23 season, due to NFL+, 98 Rock’s coverage will be blacked out except within the station’s coverage area. Pre and postgame coverage will continue to be available nationwide. A message regarding the blackout featuring various 98 Rock personalities will play for those streaming outside the coverage area.

Notable on-air staff
WXTB-FM was the home of the top rated "98 Rock All Request Morning Show" with Seabass and Heather (1990-1993), and then later Seabass and Marla (1993-1995). The station brought in former rival WYNF Program Director Charlie Logan to replace Seabass, with "The Charlie and Marla Morning Show" lasting less than one year. In December 1996, WXTB became the official flagship of the former regional radio host Todd Clem, better known as Bubba the Love Sponge. Bubba arrived for mornings at a time when the station was struggling to find a morning personality to replace the popular Seabass. Bubba had handled nights for Top 40/CHR station WFLZ ("Power 93: The Power Pig"). A huge backlash followed for months where Bubba's urban-influenced broadcast style conflicted with the 'radical surfer' Seabass and the hard rock listener mentality. Following a record-setting fine assessed by the Federal Communications Commission in February 2004 over alleged indecent content, he was fired and syndication of his morning show to affiliated stations (mainly throughout the Southeast) ceased.

Bubba would be replaced by Lex & Terry, who covered it until December 2009. Ron “Big Rig” Michaels is the last remaining original staff member still with the station 1p.m.-7p.m. daily, and is syndicated on over 100 iHeartMedia stations daily.

Concerts

Livestock 
Livestock was a series of concerts held at Festival Park in Zephyrhills Florida from 1990 to 2005.

Livestock 
The first Livestock took place from September 29–30, 1990 with the following bands performing:

Livestock 2 
Livestock 2 took place from November 15–17, 1991 with the following bands performing:

Livestock 3

Livestock 4 
Hear Comes Rusty

Livestock 5

Livestock 6

Livestock 7

Livestock 8

Livestock 9

Livestock 10

Livestock 11

Livestock 12

Livestock 13 
Livestock 13 took place from April 26–27, 2003 with the following bands performing:

Livestock 14 
Livestock 14 took place from April 23–24, 2004 with the following bands performing:

Livestock 15 
The final Livestock took place from April 28–29, 2005 with the following bands performing:

98RockFest new annual concert series 
98RockFest is a yearly rock festival held currently in Tampa, Florida by the radio station.

World's Largest Barbecue
The World's Largest Barbecue was a free concert series held at the Wagon Wheel Flea Market in Pinellas Park Florida. The last concert in this series was no longer free and held inside.

Some of the bands that played are Candlebox, Creed, Faith No More, Goldfinger, I Mother Earth, Naked, and Sugarspoon.

Guavaween 
Guavaween is an annual Latin-flavored Halloween celebration which takes place on the last Saturday of October in the historic neighborhood of Ybor City on Tampa, Florida. It is named after Tampa's nickname, "The Big Guava".

Guavaween 1994 
Guavaween 1994 took place on October 29, 1994 with the following bands performing on 98 Rock's stage.

Guavaween 1996 
Guavaween 1996 took place on October 26, 1996. The power was pulled for an hour during The Killer Kona Buds set. Possibly due to a conflict between Ybor and the choice of bands. 98 Rock had a parody of Pepper by Butthole Surfers, replacing the lyrics with lyrics making fun of the situation, where Peter Steel from Type 'O Negative was Satan and such.

The following bands performed on 98 Rock's stage:

Guavaween 1997 
Guavaween 1997 took place on October 25, 1997 with the following bands performing on 98 Rock's stage:

Creed

Guavaween 1998 
Guavaween 1998 took place on October 31, 1998 with the following bands performing on 98 Rock's stage:

Guavaween 1999 
Guavaween 1999 took place on October 30, 1999 with the following bands performing on 98 Rock's stage:

Guavaween 2000 
Guavaween 2000 took place on October 28, 2000 with the following bands performing on 98 Rock's stage:

Guavaween 2001 
Guavaween 2001 took place on October 27, 2001 with the following bands performing on 98 Rock's stage:

Guavaween 2002 
Guavaween 2002 took place on October 26, 2002 with the following bands performing on 98 Rock's stage:

Guavaween 2003 
Guavaween 2003 took place on October, 2003 with the following bands performing on 98 Rock's stage:

Guavaween 2004 
Guavaween 2004 took place on October 30, 2004 with the following bands performing on 98 Rock's stage:

Guavaween 2005 
Guavaween 2005 took place on October 29, 2005 with the following bands performing on 98 Rock's stage:

Guavaween 2006 
Guavaween 2006 took place on October 15, 2006 with the following bands performing on 98 Rock's stage:

Guavaween 2007 
Guavaween 2007 took place on October 27, 2007 with the following bands performing on 98 Rock's stage:

Guavaween 2008 
Guavaween 2008 took place on October 25, 2008 with the following bands performing on 98 Rock's stage:

Guavaween 2009 
Guavaween 2009 took place on October, 2009 with the following bands performing on 98 Rock's stage:

Guavaween 2010 
Guavaween 2010 took place on October, 2010. The following bands performed on the 98 Rock stage which was located on the northeast corner of 7th Avenue & 14th Street:

References

External links

Active rock radio stations in the United States
IHeartMedia radio stations
Radio stations established in 1967
XTB
1967 establishments in Florida